Bill Caul (born September 2, 1942) is a United States politician, who was a member of the Michigan House of Representatives from 2004 to 2010, representing the 99th District, as a member of the Republican Party.

Caul, formerly a teacher in the Mount Pleasant Public Schools, ran for the seat formerly occupied by his wife, Sandra Caul, after she was forced out by term limits. In November 2004, Caul defeated Democrat Sharon Tilmann, a former mayor of Mount Pleasant and city commissioner.

Caul was a member of the Michigan House of Representatives State Appropriation Committee. Caul won his final term in 2008, defeating Central Michigan University professor Nancy White, the Democratic nominee, and Libertarian Party nominee Devon Smith. Caul's 54 percent of the vote was the lowest percentage of the vote carried by a Republican candidate in the 99th district since his wife's re-election in 2000.

He was term limited in 2010, and was succeeded by Kevin Cotter.

Electoral history

References

External links

Michigan House Republicans bio

1942 births
Living people
People from Mount Pleasant, Michigan
Michigan State University alumni
Republican Party members of the Michigan House of Representatives
21st-century American politicians